The 2020 World Wheelchair Curling Championship was held at the Curling Hall Wetzikon in Wetzikon, Switzerland from February 29 to March 7.

In the final, Russia defeated Canada 5–4 with steals in the seventh and eighth ends. It was Russia's fourth gold medal at the Wheelchair Championship. The Canadian team won a medal for the first time since 2013. Sweden stole three in the extra end to defeat defending champions China 5–2 in the bronze medal game.

Qualification
The following nations qualified to participate in the 2020 World Wheelchair Curling Championship:

Teams
The teams are listed as follows:

Round-robin standings
Final round-robin standings

Round-robin results
All draws times are listed in Central European Time (UTC+01:00).

Draw 1
Saturday, February 29, 2:00 pm

Draw 2
Saturday, February 29, 7:00 pm

Draw 3
Sunday, March 1, 9:00 am

Draw 4
Sunday, March 1, 2:00 pm

Draw 5
Sunday, March 1, 7:00 pm

Draw 6
Monday, March 2, 9:00 am

Draw 7
Monday, March 2, 2:00 pm

Draw 8
Monday, March 2, 7:00 pm

Draw 9
Tuesday, March 3, 9:00 am

Draw 10
Tuesday, March 3, 2:00 pm

Draw 11
Tuesday, March 3, 7:00 pm

Draw 12
Wednesday, March 4, 9:00 am

Draw 13
Wednesday, March 4, 2:00 pm

Draw 14
Wednesday, March 4, 7:00 pm

Draw 15
Thursday, March 5, 9:00 am

Draw 16
Thursday, March 5, 2:00 pm

Draw 17
Thursday, March 5, 7:00 pm

Playoffs

Qualification games
Friday, March 6, 1:00 pm

Semifinals
Friday, March 6, 7:00 pm

Bronze medal game
Saturday, March 7, 10:00 am

Final
Saturday, March 7, 2:30 pm

See also
2019 World Wheelchair-B Curling Championship

References

External links

World Wheelchair Curling Championship
2020 in curling
World Wheelchair Curling Championship
International curling competitions hosted by Switzerland
World Wheelchair Curling Championship
World Wheelchair Curling Championship